The Adventures of Buratino is a 1975 Live-action Soviet two-part Children's musical television film produced by Belarusfilm.

Directed by Leonid Nechayev, the film was an adaptation of The Golden Key, or the Adventures of Buratino by Alexey Tolstoy in turn an adaptation of the 1883 Italian novel The Adventures of Pinocchio by Carlo Collodi. Inna Vetkina wrote the screenplay for The Adventures of Buratino, as well as several other films directed by Nechayev.

The plot of the film follows Buratino (Italian for "puppet"), a boy made of wood, who meets the children of Karabas Barabas' theatre and sets out to free them. In order to do so, he needs to unravel the mystery of a golden key given by the turtle Tortila. Characters such as Harlequin and Pierrot, who act in the children's theatre are part of commedia dell'arte.

Music for the film was composed by Alexey Rybnikov and the lyricists included Bulat Okudzhava, and Yuri Entin. There was an early interest by the director Nechayev to work with Yuli Kim (then writing under the last name Mikhailov) as a songwriter. At that time, Yuli Kim was banned from television, so they turned to Okudzhava. Okudzhava wrote music as well as lyrics, though only the music of Rybnikov was used in the film. The songs that Okudzhava wrote were serious and philosophical, so Nechayev also incorporated lyrics by Yuri Entin and omitted some of Okudzhava's.

Almost all of the children who acted in the film were from Minsk. Dima Iosifov played Buratino. The adults in the cast were famous actors from the rest of the Soviet Union. Nikolai Grinko played Papa Carlo. Vladimir Etush played Karabas Barabas. Rina Zelyonaya played the turtle Tortila. Rolan Bykov played the cat Bazilio.

A number of musical children's films followed, by the makers of The Adventures of Buratino, including About the Little Red Riding Hood (Про Красную Шапочку) in 1977. The television film itself has an cult following in the former Soviet Union.

Cast
Dima Iosifov - Buratino, the protagonist and the story's version of Pinocchio.Nikolai Grinko - Papa Carlo, the story's version of Geppetto.Yuriy Katin-Yartsev - Dzhuzeppe-Sizy Nos, the story's version of Mastro AntonioVladimir Etush - Karabas-Barabas, the story's Stromboli character.Rolan Bykov - Basilio the Cat, a version of the Cat.Elena Sanaeva - Alice the Fox, a version of the Fox.Rina Zelyonaya - Tortila, a wise, old turtle who helps Buratino.Tatyana Protsenko - MalvinaVladimir Basov - DuremarBaadur Tsuladze - Eating-house ownerRoman Stolkarts - PieroThomas Augustinas - ArtemonGrigori Svetlorusov - Arlekin

References

External links
 
 Приключения Буратино

1975 films
1970s television films
Belarusian musical films
1970s musical fantasy films
1970s children's fantasy films
Soviet musical fantasy films
Soviet children's fantasy films
Russian musical fantasy films
Russian children's fantasy films
Belarusfilm films
Soviet-era Belarusian films
Pinocchio films
Soviet television films
Musical television films
Films directed by Leonid Nechayev
Live-action films